Sydney Davis may refer to:

 Sammy Davis (racing driver) (Sydney Charles Houghton Davis, 1887–1981), British racing motorist, journalist, graphic artist and clubman
 Sydney Davis (Australian politician) (1829–1884), pastoralist and politician in Queensland, Australia
 Sydney Davis (South Dakota politician), member of the South Dakota House of Representatives